The Rolex Oysterquartz was a quartz watch made by Rolex.

Unusually, its movement features a mechanical lever escapement driven by a simple permanent magnet moving coil motor mechanically similar to a d'Arsonval galvanometer.

History
At the end of the 1970s,  the Swiss watch industry was affected by the quartz crisis. Japanese watchmakers supplied the world market with large quantities of quartz watches. Rolex duly put forward a new line of watches, producing the Datejust Oysterquartz. It faced the Asian markets seeking to keep alive interest in Swiss watchmaking, an industry that seemed dominated by the Japanese quartz watch.

The Datejust Oysterquartz dates back to 1976. The design differs greatly from the classic Rolex line and carved characteristics of the period: a completely angular case, an integrated band with a polished finish and sapphire glass. The whole range consisted of three versions: gold, steel with white gold bezel, and steel and yellow gold. The Datejust Oysterquartz was initially overlooked in Europe; however, it was much sought-after on the Asian and American markets. There was renewed interest in the watch once Rolex decided to take the Oysterquartz out of production. The era of the Rolex quartz watch ended in 2001, after less than 30 years. The Rolex Datejust Oysterquartz began to appear in auction catalogues, becoming a valued collectors’ object.

Model numbers
Model numbers of the Rolex Oysterquartz include:

17000 Oysterquartz Datejust, stainless steel case and polished bezel, stainless steel integral Oyster bracelet. Price: $3,025
17013 Oysterquartz Datejust, stainless steel case, 18K yellow gold fluted bezel, stainless steel/18K yellow gold integral Jubilee bracelet. Price: $5,050
17014 Oysterquartz Datejust, stainless steel case, 18K white gold fluted bezel, stainless steel integral Jubilee bracelet. Price: $3,575
19018 Oysterquartz Day-Date, 18K yellow gold case and fluted bezel, 18K yellow gold integral President bracelet with hidden clasp. Price: $16,500
19019 Oysterquartz Day-Date, 18K white gold case and fluted bezel, 18K white gold integral President bracelet with hidden clasp. Price: $18,200
19028 Oysterquartz Day-Date, 18K yellow gold case and Pyramid bezel, 18K yellow gold integral Pyramid bracelet with hidden clasp. Price: $18,500
19038 Oysterquartz Day-Date, 18K yellow gold case and Pyramid bezel with 12 brilliants, 18K yellow gold integral Pyramid bracelet with hidden clasp. Price: $21,250
19048 Oysterquartz Day-Date, 18K yellow gold case and bezel, with bezel set with 44 brilliants, dial set with 8 brilliants and 2 baguettes, 18K yellow gold integral President bracelet with hidden clasp. Price: $25,550
19049 Oysterquartz Day-Date, 18K white gold case and bezel, with bezel set with 44 brilliants, dial set with 8 brilliants and 2 baguettes, 18K white gold integral President bracelet with hidden clasp. Price: $27,250
19068 Oysterquartz Day-Date, 18K yellow gold case and bezel, with bezel set with 44 brilliants, dial set with 8 brilliants and 2 baguettes, 18K yellow gold integral Pyramid bracelet with hidden clasp. Price: $27,500
19148 Oysterquartz Day-Date, 18K yellow gold case set with 8 brilliants, 18K yellow gold bezel set with 44 brilliants, dial set with 8 brilliants and 2 baguettes, 18K yellow gold integral Karat bracelet with hidden clasp set with 308 brilliants. Price: $60,000

References

External links
 unofficial page for Oysterquartz oysterquartz.watch
 unofficial page for Oysterquartz
 Oysterquartz enthusiast account on Instagram
 unofficial page for Rolex Oyster Perpetual

Rolex watches
Products and services discontinued in 2001